The Fur Farming (Prohibition) (Scotland) Act 2002 (asp 10) is an Act of the Scottish Parliament "to prohibit the keeping of animals solely or primarily for slaughter for the value of their fur". It received Royal Assent on 11 April 2002.

The last fur farm in Scotland closed in 1993, but the Scottish Executive nevertheless described the act as necessary due to the Fur Farming (Prohibition) Act 2000, which prohibited fur farming in England and Wales.

References

External links

Acts of the Scottish Parliament 2002
Animal welfare and rights legislation in the United Kingdom
Fur
Agriculture in Scotland